Ouyang Bowen (born 19 May 1992 in Xinjing) is a Chinese male tennis player.  Ouyang won the qualifier and lost in the first round of the 2014 ATP Shenzhen Open.

Ouyang was the first player that Nick Kyrgios beat in a professional tournament, with a 6-4 6-3 victory at an ITF Futures event in Japan, in March 2012.

References

External links
 
 

1992 births
Living people
Chinese male tennis players
Hong Kong male tennis players
Tennis players from Xinjiang
Tennis players at the 2010 Summer Youth Olympics